Gustav Möller (6 June 1884 – 15 August 1970) was a prominent Swedish Social democratic politician, credited as the father of the social security system and the Welfare state, also called Folkhemmet.  He was a Member of Parliament in 1918-1954 and Member of the Government in 1924–26, 1932–36 and 1936–51.

Life and career
Gustav Möller was born in 1884 to a poor family in Malmö, Sweden, but was discovered by his employer and given an education as an office accountant; however he instead used it in the service of the labor movement, initially as a leader of its publishing house.

As Party Secretary and organizer of the Social Democratic base organization 1916–1930, he oversaw the trebling of membership and local branches.

During his terms as Minister of Social Affairs 1936-38 and 1939–51, he is credited as the creator of the Swedish social security system and the Welfare state called Folkhemmet. He was partly influenced by Alva Myrdal and Gunnar Myrdal's ideas about policies which could help families, but more by the Danish Social Democrats C. V. Bramsnæs and Karl Kristian Steincke.

There were two specific details of Möller's welfare policy that were colored by his childhood experiences:

1. There should be no stigmatization of the poor, no sorting out of those in need. Rich families as well as poor should have their children's allowance, old age pension and free medical treatment.

2. There should be as little bureaucratic paternalism and arbitrariness as possible. Eligibility should be governed by law. Preferably, the welfare assignments should be administered by the recipients themselves, as when unemployment allowances were administered by the trade unions. And allowances should always be cash.

Möller considered the welfare state a temporary stopgap rather than a goal in itself. A dedicated Socialist, he resigned from government in 1951 rather than following his party into postwar compromises with private business.

He lived in Stockholm at the time of his death in 1970, his wife Else having died in 1968.

References

Further reading
 Wilsford, David, ed. Political leaders of contemporary Western Europe: a biographical dictionary (Greenwood, 1995) pp. 332–39.

1884 births
1970 deaths
Members of the Riksdag from the Social Democrats
Swedish Ministers for Social Affairs
Politicians from Malmö
Members of the Första kammaren
Members of the Executive of the Labour and Socialist International
Members of the Andra kammaren